Shirley is a civil parish in the Derbyshire Dales district of Derbyshire, England.  The parish contains 16 listed buildings that are recorded in the National Heritage List for England.  Of these, two are listed at Grade II*, the middle of the three grades, and the others are at Grade II, the lowest grade.  The parish contains the village of Shirley and the surrounding countryside.  Most of the listed buildings are houses, cottages and associated structures, farmhouses and farm buildings.  The other listed buildings include a church, a cross in the churchyard, a public house, and a former saw mill with an adjacent shed.


Key

Buildings

References

Citations

Sources

 

Lists of listed buildings in Derbyshire